The Iranian ambassador in Cairo was the official representative of the Government in Tehran to the Government of Egypt.

List of representatives

References 

 
Egypt
Iran